Robert Bryan Harwell (born June 4, 1959) is the Chief United States district judge of the United States District Court for the District of South Carolina.

Education and career

Born in Florence, South Carolina, Harwell received a Bachelor of Arts degree from Clemson University in 1980 and a Juris Doctor from the University of South Carolina School of Law in 1982. He was in the South Carolina Army National Guard from 1987 to 1992, and was a law clerk to Judge G. Rodney Peeples of State of South Carolina Judicial Department in 1983, and to Judge G. Ross Anderson of the United States District Court for the District of South Carolina from 1983 to 1984. He was in private practice in Florence from 1984 to 2004.

Federal judicial service

On January 20, 2004, Harwell was nominated by President George W. Bush to a seat on the United States District Court for the District of South Carolina vacated by Charles Weston Houck. Harwell was confirmed by the United States Senate on June 24, 2004, and received his commission on June 30, 2004. He became Chief Judge on February 28, 2019 after Terry L. Wooten assumed senior status.

Sources

1959 births
Living people
Clemson University alumni
Judges of the United States District Court for the District of South Carolina
Military personnel from South Carolina
People from Florence, South Carolina
South Carolina lawyers
United States district court judges appointed by George W. Bush
21st-century American judges
University of South Carolina School of Law alumni